Bulloidea is a superfamily of sea snails, or bubble snails, marine gastropod mollusks.

Families
 Acteocinidae Dall, 1913
 Bullidae Gray, 1827
 Retusidae Thiele, 1925(s.s.)
 Rhizoridae Dell, 1952
 Families brought into synonymy
 Bullariidae Dall, 1908: synonym of Bullidae Gray, 1827
 Vesicidae J. Q. Burch, 1945: synonym of Bullidae Gray, 1827
 Volvulellidae Chaban, 2000: synonym of Rhizoridae Dell, 1952
 Volvulidae Locard, 1886: synonym of Rhizoridae Dell, 1952

References

  Oskars T.R., Bouchet P. & Malaquias M.A. (2015). A new phylogeny of the Cephalaspidea (Gastropoda: Heterobranchia) based on expanded taxon sampling and gene markers. Molecular Phylogenetics and Evolution. 89: 130-150

 
Cephalaspidea